The Crowning with Thorns is a 1618–1620 painting by Anthony van Dyck. He produced it aged 20 during his first Antwerp period, when he was the main studio assistant and pupil of Peter Paul Rubens. It shows Rubens' influence in its relatively sombre palette, chiaroscuro and highly realistic portrayal of musculature. He seems to have completed it early during his stay in Italy, since it also shows the influence of Titian and other Venetian painters in Jesus' face.

Once it was complete, van Dyck offered the painting to Rubens, who declined it. It was then bought by Philip IV of Spain, who held it in the Escorial before it entered the Museo del Prado, in Madrid, in 1839.

References

1620 paintings
Religious paintings by Anthony van Dyck
Paintings of the Museo del Prado by Flemish artists
van Dyck
Dogs in art